The Alternative Pupil Placement for Limited Expelled Students (acronym A.P.P.L.E.) is a high school located in the Cabbagetown neighbourhood of Toronto, Ontario, Canada. It is part of the Toronto Catholic District School Board program for students who are on a limited expulsion. Backed by Monsignor Fraser College, this program provides a flexible and individualized alternative setting for youth 16 years of age and older who are at risk and are experiencing halted success with the regular secondary school system.

As St. Martin
St. Martin Catholic School is a former Catholic elementary school from 1920 to 2002. It has a long history of serving the Catholic children in the Cabbagetown area of Toronto.

Over the years the students have been alternately served by the pastors of St. Paul's and Our Lady of Lourdes' churches. In 1995 the boundaries were expanded to allow more children to attend St. Martin. Most of these students came from Our Lady of Lourdes Catholic School. For most of the school's history, the teaching staff consisted mainly of Loretto and Ursuline nuns. In the last few decades, lay teachers have replaced the nuns in staffing the school. It was closed in 2002 and are part of the Our Lady of Lourdes community.

See also
List of high schools in Ontario

References

External links
Alternative Pupil Placement for Limited Expelled Students
Safe Schools

High schools in Toronto
Educational institutions established in 2005
Toronto Catholic District School Board
Alternative schools
2005 establishments in Ontario